Angelo's Civita Farnese is a popular Italian restaurant in the Federal Hill neighborhood of Providence, Rhode Island.

Founded in 1924, it is known as much for its atmosphere as for its food. The seating is family-style. Ownership of the restaurant has remained in the same family since it opened.

It features regularly in Rhode Island Monthly's "Best of Rhode Island" awards. In 1999, Esquire listed it in its "Greatest Lunch Ever Made" feature.

See also
 List of Italian restaurants

References

External links
 Home Page
 Capsule review
 90th Anniversary story from WPRI
 Angelo's Restaurant with Guy from Diners, Drive-Ins and Dives

Italian-American culture in Providence, Rhode Island
Restaurants in Rhode Island
Buildings and structures in Providence, Rhode Island
Restaurants established in 1924
1924 establishments in Rhode Island
Italian restaurants in the United States
Federal Hill, Providence, Rhode Island